Each "article" in this category is a collection of entries about several stamp issuers, presented in alphabetical order. The entries are formulated on the micro model and so provide summary information about all known issuers.  

See the :Category:Compendium of postage stamp issuers page for details of the project.

Jaffa (Russian Post Office) 

Dates 	1909 – 1910
Currency 	40 paras = 1 piastre

Refer 	Russian Post Offices in the Turkish Empire

Jaipur 

Dates 	1904 – 1948
Currency 	12 pies = 1 anna; 16 annas = 1 rupee

Refer 	Indian Native States

Jamaica 

Dates 	1860 –
Capital 	Kingston
Currency  	(1860) 12 pence = 1 shilling; 20 shillings = 1 pound
		(1969) 100 cents = 1 dollar

Main Article  Postage stamps and postal history of Jamaica

Jammu & Kashmir 

Dates 	1866 – 1894
Capital 	Srinagar
Currency 	12 pies = 1 anna; 16 annas = 1 rupee

Refer 	Indian Native States

Janina 

Refer 	Jannina (Italian Post Office)

Jannina (Italian Post Office) 

Dates 	1909 – 1911
Currency  	40 paras = 1 piastre

Refer 	Italian Post Offices in the Turkish Empire

Japan 

Dates 	1871 –
Capital 	Tokyo
Currency 	(1871) 100 mon = 1 sen
		(1872) 10 rin = 1 sen; 100 sen = 1 yen

Main Article  Postage stamps and postal history of Japan

Japan (British Commonwealth Occupation) 

Dates 	1946 – 1949
Currency  	12 pence = 1 shilling; 20 shillings = 1 pound

Refer 	British Occupation Issues

Japan (American Post Offices) 

Refer 	US Post Offices in Japan

Japan (British Post Offices) 

Dates 	1859 – 1879
Currency  	100 cents = 1 dollar

Refer 	British Post Offices Abroad

Japan (French Post Offices) 

Dates 	1865 – 1880
Currency  	100 centimes = 1 franc

Refer 	French Post Offices Abroad

Japanese Naval Control Area 

Dates 	1942 – 1943
Currency 	100 cents = 1 gulden

Refer 	Japanese Occupation Issues

Japanese Occupation Issues 

Main Article Needed 

Includes 	Brunei (Japanese Occupation);
		Burma (Japanese Occupation);
		Hong Kong (Japanese Occupation);
		Japanese Naval Control Area;
		Japanese Taiwan (Formosa);
		Java (Japanese Occupation);
		Kelantan (Japanese Occupation);
		Kwangtung (Japanese Occupation);
		Malaya (Japanese Occupation);
		Mengkiang (Japanese Occupation);
		Nangking & Shanghai (Japanese Occupation);
		Netherlands Indies (Japanese Occupation);
		North Borneo (Japanese Occupation);
		North China (Japanese Occupation);
		Philippines (Japanese Occupation);
		Sarawak (Japanese Occupation);
		Sumatra (Japanese Occupation)

Japanese Post Offices Abroad 

Main Article Needed 

Includes 	China (Japanese Post Offices);
		Korea (Japanese Post Offices)

Japanese Taiwan (Formosa) 

Dates 	1945 only
Capital 	Taipei
Currency 	10 rin = 1 sen; 100 sen = 1 yen

Refer 	Japanese Occupation Issues

Jasdan 

Dates 	1942 only
Currency 	12 pies = 1 anna; 16 annas = 1 rupee

Refer 	Indian Native States

Java (Japanese Occupation) 

Dates 	1943 – 1945
Currency 	100 sen (cents) = 1 rupee (gulden)

Refer 	Japanese Occupation Issues

Jeend 

Refer 	Jind

Jeind 

Refer 	Jind

Jersey 

Dates 	1941 –
Capital 	St Helier
Currency  	(1941) 12 pence = 1 shilling; 20 shillings = 1 pound
		(1970) 100 pence = 1 pound

Main Article  Postage stamps and postal history of Jersey

See also 	Great Britain (Regional Issues)

Jerusalem (Italian Post Office) 

Dates 	1909 – 1911
Currency 	40 paras = 1 piastre

Refer 	Italian Post Offices in the Turkish Empire

Jerusalem (Russian Post Office) 

Dates 	1909 – 1910
Currency 	40 paras = 1 piastre

Refer 	Russian Post Offices in the Turkish Empire

Jhalawar 

Dates 	1887 – 1900
Currency 	4 pies = 1 anna

Refer 	Indian Native States

Jhind 

Refer 	Jind

Jind 

Dates 	1874 – 1885
Currency 	12 pies = 1 anna; 16 annas = 1 rupee

Refer 	Jind in Indian Convention states

Johor 

Refer 	Johore

Johore 

Dates 	1876 –
Capital 	Johor Bahru
Currency 	100 cents = 1 dollar

Main Article Needed 

See also 	Malaysia

Jordan 

Dates 	1920 –
Capital 	Amman
Currency 	(1920) 1000 milliemes = 100 piastres = 1 Egyptian pound
		(1927) 1000 mils = 1 Palestine pound
		(1950) 1000 fils = 1 dinar

Main Article   Postage stamps and postal history of Jordan

Includes 	Palestine (Jordanian Occupation);
		Transjordan

Jubaland 

Dates 	1925 – 1926
Capital 	Kismayu
Currency  	100 centesimi = 1 lira

Main Article Needed  Postage stamps and postal history of Oltre Giuba

Refer  Italian Trans-Juba

Jugoslavia 

Refer 	Yugoslavia

Junagadh 

Refer 	Soruth (Saurashtra)

References

Bibliography
 Stanley Gibbons Ltd, Europe and Colonies 1970, Stanley Gibbons Ltd, 1969
 Stanley Gibbons Ltd, various catalogues
 Stuart Rossiter & John Flower, The Stamp Atlas, W H Smith, 1989
 XLCR Stamp Finder and Collector's Dictionary, Thomas Cliffe Ltd, c.1960

External links
 AskPhil – Glossary of Stamp Collecting Terms
 Encyclopaedia of Postal History

Jaffa